Quinolidomicin A1 is a 60-membered macrocyclic compound isolated from Micromonospora sp. JY16. Quinolidomicins are a class of macrolides that contain a benzoquinone chromophore as well as an immense lactone ring, which far surpasses that in monozanomycin. It is currently the largest identified macrolide of terrestrial origin. It was initially discovered when in a screening for anti-tumor antibiotics, where it was found to be cytotoxic against P388 murine leukemia cells (IC50 8 nM), and has later been found to have strong cytotoxic activity against HT-29, MKN28, K562, and KB.

Biosynthesis 
Like many macrocyclic polyketides, quinolidomicin A1 is biosynthesized by type-I polyketide synthases. Decarboxylative condensations for a single-chain elongation are facilitated by β-ketosynthase (KS), acyl transferase (AT), and acyl carrier protein (ACP). The modification domains that contribute to structural variations are dehydratase (DH), enoylreductase (ER), and β-ketoreductase (KR). A module refers to a set of these domains. The acyclic chain is then cut by thioesterase (TE). As this is such a large macrolide, it contains many modules across 13 open reading frames (ORF) to be biosynthesized, the order shown as a sequence of these domains.

References 

Macrocycles
Oxygen heterocycles
Heterocyclic compounds with 2 rings